From the Inside Out is the second studio album by Australian-New Zealand recording artist Stan Walker, released on 20 August 2010 through Sony Music Australia. Walker worked with several record producers and songwriters for the album, including Audius Mtawarira, Israel Cruz, Ryan Tedder, Phil Tan and Stuart Crichton, among others. Musically, the album incorporates synthpop, rock, soul and R&B genres.

Upon its release, the album received positive reviews from music critics. From the Inside Out debuted at number one on the New Zealand Albums Chart and was certified platinum by the Recording Industry Association of New Zealand (RIANZ). It also debuted at number two on the Australian ARIA Albums Chart. Preceding the album's release, lead single "Unbroken" was released digitally on 12 April 2010. The song reached the top-ten of the New Zealand Singles Chart and was certified gold by the RIANZ. "Choose You" was released on 20 July 2010 as the album's second single and peaked at number three on the New Zealand Singles Chart and was certified platinum. It also appeared on the ARIA Singles Chart at number 16 and was certified platinum by the Australian Recording Industry Association (ARIA). The third single, "Homesick", featuring rapper Kayo, was released on 29 October 2010. Walker's first headlining tour in New Zealand, to support the album, ran from mid February to early March 2011.

Background and development
On 1 July 2010, Walker announced the album's title and release date in an exclusive video message to his fans via Facebook, YouTube and his official website. Later that month, Walker's record label began uploading snippets of several of the album's songs onto YouTube. Ahead of the album's release, MusicFix gave fans an exclusive first listen to the album before it was officially released.

In an interview with New Zealand's One News, Walker explained that the album reflects him and his personality, including his Māori roots. In describing the album, he said:
I guess I just wanted this album to be a lot about me and all the different styles of music that I like – not just one sort of style or genre. I really want to be able to tell real stories through my music, rather than talking about stuff that doesn't really matter which is what a lot of people seem to end up doing these days. I don't want it to be just glossy and disposable; I want my songs to deal with real issues.

Composition 
From the Inside Out combines the genres of pop, rock, hip hop, soul and R&B. Lead single "Unbroken" has been described as a "chest-beating and uplifting" single, while the second single, "Choose You" has been appreciated for its "soaring pop and grand stomp". According to Cameron Adams from The Daily Telegraph, "Inside Out" "borrows Usher's electro thunderclaps and robo-R&B". "All I Need" makes use of Auto-Tune and has been compared to will.i.am. According to Scott Kara of The New Zealand Herald, "Homesick" is "lush, pure pop" and "One Thing" is influenced by R&B and hip hop. "The One", featuring Pixie Lott, has been called "a dramatic ballad", and "Love Graffiti" has been compared to The Beatles. Most of the songs' lyrics explore the theme of love. Walker stated, "I wanted to make an album of songs, with real lyrics about how we all feel sometimes. There's a lot of manufactured songs with nasty lyrics, but I wanted to talk about real love, real situations that people could really connect to." He named "Love Graffiti" as his favourite track for that reason, valuing the positive way it portrays love.

Release and promotion 
From the Inside Out was released in Australia on 20 August 2010 through Sony Music Australia, as both digital download and CD formats. A New Zealand release followed on 23 August. A bonus track was added to the album's digital release: a remix of "Choose You". During the album's first week of release, Walker toured shopping malls in Sydney and Melbourne, performing several of the album's songs and signing CDs. The album was also promoted by Walker through a live televised performance of "Choose You" on Sunrise on 25 August 2010. On 26 August 2010, Walker held an instore appearance at the Sylvia Park shopping centre in Auckland, New Zealand.

Tour 

Walker commenced his first headlining tour in New Zealand in mid February 2011, and ended in early March. Concerts were announced in December 2010 for Wellington, Palmerston North, New Plymouth, Hamilton, Hastings, Tauranga, Auckland, Rotorua and Christchurch. Due to an overwhelming demand, the tour extended to include new shows in Dunedin, Invercargill, Timaru, Oamaru and Opotiki. New Zealand R&B and soul singer Erakah served as the opening act on all dates of the tour. A New Zealand Tour Edition reissue of From the Inside Out was released on 28 January 2011.

Singles 
"Unbroken" was released as the album's lead single on 12 April 2010. The song was written and produced by OneRepublic frontman Ryan Tedder. It peaked at number nine on the New Zealand Singles Chart, and number 23 on the Australian ARIA Singles Chart. "Unbroken" was certified gold by the Recording Industry Association of New Zealand (RIANZ), and by the Australian Recording Industry Association (ARIA). "Choose You" was released as the album's second single on 20 July 2010. The song peaked at number three in New Zealand and was certified platinum. It also reached number 16 in Australia and was certified platinum by the ARIA. "Homesick", featuring rapper Kayo, was released as the album's third and final single on 29 October 2010. The song failed to impact the charts in Australia, however it managed to reach number 21 in New Zealand and was certified gold by the RIANZ.

Reception
Scott Kara from The New Zealand Herald awarded the album four out of five stars and wrote that, "It's all wholesome, family-friendly stuff, and when Walker sings about love it's from the heart". Drew Taylor from Warcry wrote that, "Stan's voice has never sounded better, and the combination of faith and flavour is force to be reckoned with." Allmusic's Jon O'Brien rated From the Inside Out three stars out of five.

From the Inside Out debuted at number one on the New Zealand Albums Chart, and became Walker's first number one album in the country. It was eventually certified platinum by the Recording Industry Association of New Zealand (RIANZ), for selling 15,000 copies. The album remained on the chart for forty non-consecutive weeks. In Australia, the album debuted at number two on the ARIA Albums Chart.

Track listing

Notes
Track 12, "Kissing You", is a cover of the 1997 single by Des'ree.
Track 13, "Stuck in a Box", originally featured on Young Sid's album, What Doesn't Kill Me... (2010).

Personnel
Credits for From the Inside Out adapted from Allmusic.

Craig Bauer – mixing
Jeff Breakey – assistant mixing
Marcus Byrne – assistant mixing
Andrew Cameron – business affairs
David Champion – management
Tom Coyne – mastering
Pete Craigie – mixing
Stuart Crichton – keyboards, production, programming, string arrangements, vocal production
Israel Cruz – production
Cassie Davis – keyboards, production
Carl Dimataga – guitar
Pat Handlin – A&R
Jason Ierace – photography
Tommy Lee James – piano
Damien Lewis assistant mixing

Vlado Meller – mastering
Audius Mtawarira – mixing, production, vocal production
Spencer Nezey – production
Fridolin Nordsoe – additional production
Greg Organ – production
Sally Piper – A&R administration
Mark Santangelo – assistant mastering
Jade Seenandan – production
Leon Seenandan – mixing, production, vocal production
Jay Dee Springbett – A&R
Phil Tan – additional production, mixing
Frederik Tao – additional production
Ryan Tedder – arrangement, drum programming, engineering, piano, production, programming, background vocals
Stan Walker – vocals
Erin Zerner – A&R administration

Charts and certification

Weekly charts

Year-end charts

Release history

See also 
List of number-one albums in 2010 (New Zealand)

References 

2010 albums
Soul albums by Australian artists
Stan Walker albums
Sony Music Australia albums
Albums produced by Emile Haynie
Albums produced by Ryan Tedder